The Sewell Valley Subdivision is a railroad line owned by CSX Transportation in the U.S. state of West Virginia. It was formerly part of the CSX Huntington East Division. It became part of the CSX Florence Division on June 20, 2016.

At its south end the line wye's off of the New River Subdivision and at its north end the track comes to an end. The line has junctions with the Rupert Subdivision and the G&E Subdivision.

See also
 List of CSX Transportation lines

References

CSX Transportation lines